Balanites is an Afrotropical, Palearctic and Indomalayan  genus of flowering plants in the caltrop family, Zygophyllaceae. The name Balanites derives from the Greek word for an acorn and refers to the fruit, it was coined by Alire Delile in 1813.

Species
The following species are included in the genus Balanites:
 Balanites aegyptiaca (L.) Delile
Balanites angolensis (Welw.) Mildbr. & Schltr. 
Balanites glabra Mildbr. & Schltr. 
 Balanites maughamii Sprague
Balanites pedicellaris Mildbr. & Schltr. 
Balanites rotundifolia (Tiegh.) Blatt. 
 Balanites roxburghii Planch.
Balanites triflora Tiegh. 
Balanites wilsoniana Dawe & Sprague

References

External links

 
Rosid genera